Patersonia spirafolia (common name - spiral-leaved Patersonia) is a species of plant in the iris family Iridaceae and is endemic to Western Australia.

It was first described by Gregory John Keighery in 1990. There are no synonyms.

Gallery

Description 
Patersonia spirafolia is a perennial herb which grows to 50 cm high in tussocks up to 40 cm wide. It has a woody rootstock. The leaves are linear (20 cm by 5 mm) and spirally twisted. The leaf margins are fringed with soft hairs pointing towards the centre of the leaf. The reddish-green scape is up to 25 cm long, 1-2 mm wide. The structure which envelops the flower cluster is brown. The flowers have three broad, mauve sepals and three very small, upright, blue-violet petals.

It is found to the south west of Badgingarra, growing on sand over laterite.

References

spirafolia
Flora of Western Australia
Plants described in 1990
Taxa named by Gregory John Keighery